Fort Cooper Creek is a stream off of Lick Creek in Hickman County, Tennessee, in the United States.

History
Fort Cooper was the name given to the log cabin of the local Cooper family of pioneer settlers.

See also
List of rivers of Tennessee

References

Rivers of Hickman County, Tennessee
Rivers of Tennessee